School Lake is a lake in Berrien County, in the U.S. state of Michigan.

School Lake was named for the fact a schoolhouse once stood near its southeastern shore.

References

Lakes of Berrien County, Michigan